Horst Kessler (born 5 April 1940) is a German chemist and Emeritus Professor of Excellence at the Institute for Advanced Study at the Technical University of Munich (TUM). Kessler works in the area of bioorganic chemistry, in particular peptide synthesis, and nuclear magnetic resonance spectroscopy. He also made contributions to magnetic resonance imaging.

Education and career 
Kessler studied chemistry at the Leipzig University in 1958–1961. He completed his Master (Diplom) in 1963, and his PhD at 1966 with Eugen Müller at the University of Tübingen. In 1969, he underwent habilitation in organic chemistry. He was briefly a university lecturer at Tübingen, then he obtained an organic chemistry lecturer position at the University of Frankfurt am Main. In 1989, he became Professor of organic chemistry and biochemistry at the Technical University of Munich (TUM), where he was in charge of overseeing the installation of one of the four 900 MHz NMR spectrometers in Germany at that time. At TUM, he was Dean of the Faculty of Chemistry, Biology and Earth Sciences from 1994–1996. From October 2008, he is a Carl-von-Linde Professor (Emeritus Professor of Excellence) at the TUM Institute for Advanced Study.

Notable achievements and awards 
In 1996, Kessler became a member of the Bavarian Academy of Sciences and Humanities, one of the eight state academies in Germany. In 2002, he was elected to membership of the Academy of Sciences Leopoldina, the national academy of Germany.

 R. Bruce Merrifield Award, American Peptide Society, 2015.
 Josef Rudinger Memorial Award (joint with Manfred Mutter), European Peptide Society, 2008.
 Burckhardt Helferich Prize for bioorganic chemistry, 2005. 
 Vincent du Vigneaud Award, American Peptide Society, 2002.
 Max Planck Research Prize, Max Planck Society, 2001.
 Emil Fischer Medal, German Chemical Society, 1997.

Publications 
The following research articles are the most highly cited according to the Google Scholar profile of Kessler :

 
 
 Kessler, Horst (July 1982). "Conformation and Biological Activity of Cyclic Peptides". Angewandte Chemie International Edition in English. 21 (7): 512–523. . ISSN 0570-0833.

Personal life 
Horst Kessler was the son of Walter and Gertrude Kessler. He went to school from 1946–1958 in Suhl.

References 

20th-century German chemists
Living people
1940 births
People from Suhl
21st-century German chemists
Academic staff of the Technical University of Munich